The A-3177 (LT-2500) was a diesel-electric transfer-unit locomotive, built by the Lima-Hamilton Corporation between 1950 and 1951. The A-3177 was the final locomotive model produced by Lima-Hamilton before the company merged with the Baldwin Locomotive Works in September 1951 to form the Baldwin-Lima-Hamilton Corporation (BLH).  

All twenty-two units were ordered by the Pennsylvania Railroad, with the last one, #5683, completed on September 12th 1951, the day after BLH was formed. All were scrapped, with the last three being retired by 1967. The PRR ordered 22 more but agreed to receive 23 RT-624s from BLH instead.

See also
 Baldwin DT-6-6-2000 and Baldwin RT-624, both similar center-cab style transfer units.

References 

Lima diesel locomotives
C-C locomotives
Railway locomotives introduced in 1950
Pennsylvania Railroad locomotives
Standard gauge locomotives of the United States
Scrapped locomotives